Wallace Francis Buttsworth (21 January 1917 – 22 May 2002) was an Australian rules footballer who played for Essendon in the Victorian Football League (VFL).

Family
Wally had 2 younger brothers Fred and Brian Buttsworth. Fred Buttsworth was also a cricketer and footballer. Brian Buttsworth played for West Perth Football Club. Their father, Frederick Richard Buttsworth, was himself a first-class cricketer.

Football
Before he joined Essendon, Buttsworth played for the West Perth Football Club.

A defender, Buttsworth was a best and fairest winner for Essendon on three occasions and played in two VFL premiership teams inn 1942 and 1946. He is the centre half-back in Essendon's 'Team of the Century'. He was broadly considered best on ground in the club's one point 1947 grand final loss against , taking 25 marks at centre half-back for the game.

Cricket
He represented Western Australia in two first-class cricket matches.

Champions of Essendon 
In 2002 an Essendon panel ranked him at 12 in their Champions of Essendon list of the 25 greatest players ever to have played for Essendon.

References

External links

1917 births
2002 deaths
Australian rules footballers from Perth, Western Australia
Essendon Football Club players
Essendon Football Club Premiership players
Champions of Essendon
Western Australia cricketers
West Perth Football Club players
Crichton Medal winners
Australian cricketers
Cricketers from Perth, Western Australia
Two-time VFL/AFL Premiership players
Sportsmen from Western Australia